The 2019–20 version of the Syrian Cup is the 50th edition to be played. It is the premier knockout tournament for football teams in Syria. Al-Wathba are the defending champions.

The winners of the competition will enter the 2021 AFC Cup.

First round

Final phase

Bracket

Second round

Third round

Quarter-finals

Semi-finals

Final

References

Syrian Cup
Syria
Cup